Medicolegal is something that involves both medical and legal aspects, mainly:
Medical jurisprudence, a branch of medicine
Medical law, a branch of law